Ben-Aharon is a patronymic surname most commonly found in Israel, originating from "Aaron" (meaning "lofty") of the Old Testament, and meaning "son of mountaineer". There are several patronym surname variants including "Aharonson", "Aaronson", and "Aaronsohn". Aharon is a Hebrew masculine given name common in Israel. Notable people with the surname Ben-Aharon include:

 Jesaiah Ben-Aharon (born 1955), Israeli philosopher
 Yitzhak Ben-Aharon (1906 - 2006), Israeli politician
Variant
 Michal Aharon, Israeli computer scientist
 Oded Aharonson (b. ?), American assistant professor of planetary science at the California Institute of Technology

References

See also
 Aarons (disambiguation)
 Aaronson
 Aaronsohn
 Aron (disambiguation)

Jewish surnames
Patronymic surnames